James Man (1755–1823) was the founder of Man Group.

Biography
Born in Whitechapel and apprenticed to a William Humphrey as a barrel maker, James Man decided to establish his own business as a sugar-broker in 1783.

In 1784, he secured a contract to supply the Royal Navy with rum. This business grew into Man Group, a substantial investment management business.
He retired in 1819 and moved to Dartmouth, Devon, where he died in 1823.

Family
James Man married Sarah Roberts in 1781.

References

1755 births
1823 deaths
British businesspeople
Date of birth missing
Date of death missing
People from Whitechapel